The Last Blade 2 is a video game developed and released by SNK in 1998. Like its predecessor, The Last Blade, it is a weapons-based versus fighting game originally released to arcades via the Neo Geo MVS arcade system, although it has since been released for various other platforms.

Gameplay 

Gameplay elements remain the same as its predecessor with some minor adjustments. An "EX" mode was added to play, which is a combination of "Speed" and "Power". The mood is grimmer than its predecessor through the introduction to the game. The characters are colored slightly darker, and the game's cut-scenes are made longer to emphasize the importance of the plot. Characters are no longer equal, hosting greater differences of strengths and weaknesses than before.

Plot
The game is set one year after the events of the first game. Long before humanity existed, death was an unknown, equally distant concept. When death first came to the world, the "Messenger from Afar" was born. With time, the Sealing Rite was held to seal Death behind Hell's Gate. At that time, two worlds, one near and one far, were born, beginning the history of life and death. Half a year has passed since Suzaku's madness, and the underworld is still linked by a great portal. Our world has been called upon. Legends of long ago told of the sealing of the boundary between the two worlds. The Sealing Rite would be necessary to hold back the spirits of that far away world.

Characters

Three new characters were introduced:

 Hibiki Takane: daughter of a famed swordsmith, she is searching for the silver-haired man that requested the final blade her father would ever make.
 Setsuna: a being believed to be the "Messenger from Afar", he requested a blade to be forged by Hibiki's father, and is out to slay the Sealing Maiden.
 Kojiroh Sanada: Shinsengumi captain of Unit Zero; investigating the Hell's Portal.

Home versions
The Last Blade 2 was made available for various consoles, including SNK's own Neo Geo AES and Neo Geo CD. The Neo Geo CD version includes an extra quiz mode, voiced cutscenes, and a gallery section featuring art from both Last Blade titles. Most of these additional features were also included with the Dreamcast port titled Last Blade 2: Heart of the Samurai, released in 2001. The Neo Geo CD and Dreamcast versions added an additional character named Musashi Akatsuki.

The Last Blade 2 was subsequently bundled with the original Last Blade for a PlayStation 2 compilation released only in Japan; both games are arcade perfect emulations of the original games. At PlayStation Experience 2015, SNK Playmore announced PlayStation 4 and PlayStation Vita versions of The Last Blade 2 developed by Code Mystics.

Reception 

In Japan, Game Machine listed The Last Blade 2 on their December 15, 1998 issue as being the second most popular arcade game at the time. According to Famitsu, the Neo Geo CD sold over 9,379 copies in its first week on the market. Blake Fischer reviewed the Dreamcast version of the game for Next Generation, rating it three stars out of five, and stated that "A unique 2D fighter for Dreamcast which is a welcome break from the plethora of Street Fighter variants we've seen in the States. Too bad you'll have to track down an import to play." In 2012, GamesRadar+ included Last Blade 2 among the little-known classic fighting games that deserve HD remakes, calling it "one of the Neo Geo’s prettiest, deepest fighters."

Notes

References

External links 
 
 The Last Blade 2 at GameFAQs
 The Last Blade 2 at Giant Bomb
 The Last Blade 2 at Killer List of Videogames
 The Last Blade 2 at MobyGames

1998 video games
ACA Neo Geo games
Arcade video games
Dreamcast games
D4 Enterprise games
Neo Geo CD games
Neo Geo games
Multiplayer and single-player video games
Nintendo Switch games
PlayStation Network games
PlayStation 4 games
SNK games
SNK Playmore games
Fighting games
2D fighting games
Video game sequels
Video games with cross-platform play
Virtual Console games
Windows games
Xbox One games
Video games developed in Japan
Code Mystics games
Hamster Corporation games
Agetec games